The 2011–12 Czech Extraliga season was the 19th season of the Czech Extraliga since its creation after the breakup of Czechoslovakia and the Czechoslovak First Ice Hockey League in 1993.

Standings

Playoffs

Bracket 

The playoff bracket is not a fixed bracket. Like the intraconference bracket in the NHL, the matchups are adjusted in each successive round in order to place the top-ranked team against the bottom-ranked team.

Relegation

References

External links 
 

2011-12
Czech
1